Chance is a quarterly non-technical statistics magazine published jointly by the American Statistical Association and Taylor & Francis Group. It was established in 1988, and Taylor & Francis has published it since 2012. The magazine sponsors the blog "The Statistics Forum", which allows anyone to post their thoughts on probability and statistics.

References

External links

Quarterly magazines published in the United States
American Statistical Association
Magazines established in 1988